James Domville was a Canadian politician.

James Domville is also the name of:

James de Beaujeu Domville (1933–2015), French-born Canadian theatrical producer and administrator
Sir James Graham Domville, 3rd Baronet (1812–1887), of the Domville baronets
Sir James Henry Domville, 5th Baronet (1889–1919), of the Domville baronets

See also
Domville (disambiguation)